Carolus may refer to:

People
 Carolus (name)
 the medieval Latin form of the name Charles
Charlemagne (742–814)
 King Charles XII of Sweden, who is sometimes referred to as "Carolus Rex"

Scientific
 Carolus (plant), a genus of flowering plants in the family Malpighiaceae
 Carolus (bug), a genus of insects in the family Cixiidae
 16951 Carolus Quartus, an asteroid

Miscellaneous
 Carolus (coin), several coins
 Carolus, several ships; see List of Swedish ships of the line

See also
 Carl (name)
 Charles
 Karl (disambiguation)